The National Trust - Sri Lanka or National Trust for Cultural and Natural Heritage is a non-profit organisation, which works to preserve and protect the natural and cultural heritage of Sri Lanka and to increase public awareness of the country's historic and architectural treasures. The Trust was founded on 25 May 2005 by archaeologists, Professor Senake Bandaranayake and Doctor Roland Silva.

These activities of the Trust are primarily directed towards what is not already protected or safeguarded by the Government, through the Archaeological Department of Sri Lanka and the Central Cultural Fund.

The National Trust - Sri Lanka has built a good working relationship with other National Trusts worldwide, equally with the organisations and their members, in places such as Canada, Scotland, England, Ireland, Wales, and the United States.

Projects

Malwana fort

The National Trust has completed the first stage of conservation of the colonial fort at Malwana, with funds provided by the Prince Claus Foundation of Netherlands.

Lawton's photographs
The National Trust has completed the conservation of photographs of national heritage sites taken by Joseph Lawton between 1867 and 1875. The photographs are of sites in Anuradhapura, Mihintale, Polonnaruwa and Sigiriya and are contained in four volumes kept at the Department of Archaeology.

Artifacts index
The National Trust has prepared an index of over 500 artifacts found in several temples in the Gampaha District.

Published works

References

External links 
  National Trust - Sri Lanka

Sri Lanka
Tourism in Sri Lanka
2005 establishments in Sri Lanka
Organizations established in 2005